Zdenko Bego (12 February 1933 – 20 December 2014) was a Yugoslav rowing cox. He competed at the 1952 Summer Olympics in Helsinki with the men's eight where they were eliminated in the semi-finals repêchage.

References

1933 births
2014 deaths
Yugoslav male rowers
Olympic rowers of Yugoslavia
Rowers at the 1952 Summer Olympics
Rowers from Split, Croatia
Coxswains (rowing)
European Rowing Championships medalists
Burials at Lovrinac Cemetery